The Pitkin Hatchery is a Colorado Parks and Wildlife cold water fish production facility located in Gunnison National Forest right off of Quartz Creek Valley in Gunnison County.

History
Pitkin Hatchery was inaugurated in 1914. The land was purchased by Scott Land as a response to cold-water problems, such as limited stock in surrounding waters. The building was constructed in 1906 and built to hold a capacity of one million eggs per year. The elevation spans from 9033 ft - 9446 ft.

Mission
An overarching mission among the hatchery staff is conservation through the production of the Rio Grande cutthroat trout, which is one of Colorado's native fish.

Fish species
The facility focuses on broodstock and production of trout and kokanee salmon. Hatchery staff works to support the raising of 1 million fish annually, including 150,000 catchable rainbow trout. Rio Grande cutthroat trout are also raised as brood fish. Their source of water comes from a groundwater spring.

References 

Fish hatcheries in the United States
Buildings and structures in Gunnison County, Colorado
Tourist attractions in Colorado